Ogilvy Renault LLP was a Canadian law firm with 450 members in offices in Montreal, Ottawa, Quebec, Toronto, Calgary and London, England. Ogilvy Renault offered services in the areas of business law, litigation and ADR, employment and labour law and intellectual property. Ogilvy Renault offered services in both English and French and in civil and common law.

History
The firm began in 1879 as Carter, Church & Chapleau in Quebec. In 2001, the firm merged with Meighen Demers LLP of Toronto.

On November 15, 2010, Ogilvy Renault announced it was joining the British firm of Norton Rose with the merger being completed on June 1, 2011, making it one of the 10 largest law firms in the world.

Alumni
 former Quebec Conservative premier Joseph-Adolphe Chapleau
 former Quebec Conservative Party leader Adrien D. Pouliot
 former prime minister Brian Mulroney
 former Canadian ambassador to the United Nations Yves Fortier
 former Conservative senator Michael Meighen
 former Conservative senator and Minister of International Trade Michael Fortier 
 former Chief Justice of Quebec Pierre Michaud
 former Ontario Attorney-General and Liberal MPP Michael Bryant
 former President & CEO of OMERS Strategic Investments Jacques Demers

References

External links
Decker & Bose

Defunct law firms of Canada
Law firms established in 1879
Law firms disestablished in 2011
Canadian companies established in 1879
Canadian companies disestablished in 2011